The 2017 season was Lancashire Thunder's second season, in which they competed in the Women's Cricket Super League, a Twenty20 competition. The side finished bottom of the group stage, losing all five of their matches.

The side was captained by Danielle Hazell and coached by Stephen Titchard. They played one home match apiece at Old Trafford, Stanley Park and Aigburth Cricket Ground.

Squad
Lancashire Thunder announced their 15-player squad in May 2017. Age given is at the start of Lancashire Thunder's first match of the season (11 August 2017).

Women's Cricket Super League

Season standings

 Advanced to the Final.
 Advanced to the Semi-final.

League stage

Statistics

Batting

Bowling

Fielding

Wicket-keeping

References

Lancashire Thunder seasons
2017 in English women's cricket